The yellow-spotted bush sparrow or yellow-spotted petronia (Gymnoris pyrgita) is a species of bird in the sparrow family, Passeridae.

It is common throughout the Sahel and the Horn of Africa. Its natural habitats are dry savannah and subtropical or tropical dry lowland grassland.

References

Yellow-spotted petronia
Birds of the Sahel
Birds of the Horn of Africa
Yellow-spotted petronia
Taxa named by Theodor von Heuglin
Taxonomy articles created by Polbot